Đulekare is a village in the municipality of Medveđa, Serbia. According to the 2002 census, the village has a population of 117 people. Of these, 70 (59,82 %) were Serbs, and 47 (40,17 %) were ethnic Albanians.

References

Populated places in Jablanica District
Albanian communities in Serbia